The Pareung Cho clan is one of the Korean clans. Their Bon-gwan is in Yueyang, Hunan, which was once known as Baling (巴陵) or Pareung in Korean. Their founder was  who was a Hanlin Academy in Ming dynasty. He was exiled to Korea when Ming dynasty was destroyed by Qing dynasty. He made Pareung Cho clan’s Bon-gwan which was ’s hometown to escape from assassins and to hide in North Hamgyong Province.

See also 
 Korean clan names of foreign origin

References

External links 
 

 
Korean clan names of Chinese origin
Cho clans